Aphyocypris amnis is a species of cyprinid in the genus Aphyocypris. It is native only to a tributary of the Shuili River in Taiwan.

References

Cyprinidae
Fish of Taiwan
Cyprinid fish of Asia